Tayyebi is a surname. It may refer to:

Behnam Tayyebi Kermani (born 1975), Iranian wrestler
Hossein Tayyebi Bidgoli (born 1988), Iranian futsal player
Mohammad Tayyebi, Iranian footballer
Mostafa Tayyebi (born 1987), Iranian futsal player